Aluminium acetotartrate (or ALSOL) is an organic acid, astringent, and disinfectant. It is the aluminium salt of acetic acid and tartaric acid.

Appearance
Aluminium acetotartrate occurs as colorless or yellowish crystals, freely but exceedingly slowly soluble in water and insoluble in alcohol and ether.

Applications
Aluminium acetotartrate is employed in 0.5–2% solutions as a nasal douche in affections of the respiratory tract, in 1–3% solutions as a substitute for solution of aluminium acetate, in concentrated solution as a lotion in frostbite and balanitis, and as a snuff with boric acid in atrophic rhinitis. It is also used as an antiseptic vulnerary ointment cream.

References

Otologicals
Tartrates
Acetates
Aluminium compounds